The GY-80 Horizon is a French four-seat touring monoplane of the 1960s designed by  and built under licence, first by Sud Aviation, and later by that company's SOCATA subsidiary.

Design and development

This aircraft was designed by well-known French designer  during the 1950s. In 1960, Sud Aviation acquired from Gardan a licence to build the design. The prototype first flew on 21 July 1960 and the aircraft was initially produced by Sud Aviation at Nantes and Rochefort. Sud Aviation later acquired the bankrupt Morane-Saulnier aircraft company, and in 1966, formed the subsidiary SOCATA to continue production of the Morane-Saulnier Rallye; however, Sud Aviation soon transferred production of its other general aviation aircraft to SOCATA as well. Sud-Aviation and its SOCATA subsidiary manufactured 267 units by the end of 1969, when production was terminated.

The all-metal design has a low-mounted cantilever wing with four mechanically operated Fowler-type trailing-edge flaps and two Frise-type ailerons. The tricycle landing gear partially retracts, with all wheels retracting rearwards. (A little more than half of each wheel remains exposed in the retracted position). The first prototype used a  Avco Lycoming O-320 flat air-cooled engine driving a fixed-pitch metal propeller, with production aircraft using this engine or a  version of the O-320, and had an option to use a constant speed propeller. By 1966, a  Lycoming O-360 engine was available., and the 150 hp option was removed by 1967.

Most Horizons were bought by French pilot owners, but examples were exported to several countries including Germany, Switzerland and the United Kingdom and numbers remain in service in 2014.

An improved variant was developed originally as the Super Horizon 200 and later went into production as the ST 10 Diplomate.

Operators

Royal Cambodian Air Force

Khmer Air Force - Former operator.

Specifications (GY-80-180 - constant speed propeller)

See also

References

Notes

Bibliography

1960s French civil utility aircraft
Horizon
Single-engined tractor aircraft
Low-wing aircraft
Aircraft first flown in 1960